Coy Craft (born May 23, 1997) is a former American soccer player.

Career

Youth
Craft joined the FC Dallas academy in 2011, where he played with the side that won five consecutive U.S. Soccer Development Academy Texas/Frontier Division titles.

Professional
Craft signed a professional Homegrown Player contract with FC Dallas on August 1, 2013. He made his debut on October 25, 2014 as an 84th-minute substitute in a 0–2 loss against Portland Timbers.

International 
Craft was selected to the U.S. squad for the 2017 CONCACAF U-20 Championship. The U.S. ended up winning the tournament. Craft successfully converted his penalty kick in the penalty shootout victory over Honduras in the championship match.

Honors

Club

FC Dallas 
 U.S. Open Cup: 2016
 Supporters' Shield: 2016

International 
United States
 CONCACAF U-20 Championship: 2017

References

External links

1997 births
Living people
American soccer players
Homegrown Players (MLS)
FC Dallas players
OKC Energy FC players
Miami FC players
Association football forwards
Soccer players from Virginia
Major League Soccer players
United States men's youth international soccer players
United States men's under-20 international soccer players
USL Championship players